Death Before Dishonor IX (DBD IX) was the 9th ROH Death Before Dishonor professional wrestling pay-per-view (PPV) event produced by Ring of Honor (ROH). It took place on September 17, 2011, at the Grand Ballroom of the Manhattan Center in the New York City borough of Manhattan.

Results

See also
2011 in professional wrestling
List of Ring of Honor pay-per-view events

References

External links
Ring of Honor's official website

Ring of Honor pay-per-view events
2011 in New York City
Events in New York City
9
Professional wrestling in New York City
September 2011 events in the United States
2011 Ring of Honor pay-per-view events